Twilight Eyes is a novel by American writer Dean Koontz, released in 1985 (the original version, published by Land of Enchantment) and 1987 (expanded version, Berkley). Throughout the book, a character with the self-appointed name "Slim MacKenzie" uses his psychic powers to hunt Goblins – a kind of monster that seems to have the ability to mimic human beings.

Plot summary
The book begins with Slim sneaking up on, and killing, a "goblin or beast" on the fair grounds of a local carnival. Goblins are monsters which can shape shift between human and bestial forms, genetically engineered super-predators which desire bloodshed and human misery. Created in an ancient, technologically superior era of human civilization, they exist to torment and ultimately murder humans.  They can only be seen by a few people, including Slim himself, Rya Raines (his wife), and Joel Tuck (Slim's friend and fellow carnie). These goblins are superhuman and extremely dangerous and genocidal, at least as intelligent as us, and can mimic human behavior.  While they appear and act as a normal person would, they experience only negative emotions like fear and hate. Their only pleasure is in torturing and murdering humans.

Slim's claim to fame is his "Twilight Eyes", which give him the ability to receive psychic, or prophetic, premonitions of the future. They also allow him to see through the human seeming disguise of the goblins. These eyes are named what they are because they are colored purple like the skyline at dusk.

After this encounter, Slim proceeds to join the carnival (one of many he has drifted from) as a way to support himself while killing goblins and hiding from his murderous past (in which he killed an uncle by marriage that was a goblin responsible for the deaths of several family members). One of the prominent members of the "carnies" is a young woman named Rya Raines, who quickly becomes his lover and confidant. As their relationship matures, Slim has several more run-ins with the goblins which leads to the revelation that his friend Joel, and even Rya herself, can see the goblins too, and that each of them in their own way has suffered terribly from the goblins' actions in their past. It is soon revealed that Rya had long before made a pact with the goblins to report to them whenever she found someone who could see through their disguise in exchange for safety from their predations. She wants him to make the same pact with them, but he refuses. This reality creates a gulf between her and Slim that comes to bloodshed between them. She regrets this later and after reconciling with Slim she  becomes his wife. They decide to go on a mission to destroy any and all of the creatures they possibly can.

Together they set out on a personal mission to wage a secret war against the monsters in a small mining town named Yontsdown, Pennsylvania, the seeming center of their cruel and brutal version of civilization. There they would discover and face the ultimate, diabolical plans the goblins had for the world and all of mankind.

Differences in the two versions
This book was released in two entirely different forms. The first hardback printing was actually only the first half of the story. The full text appeared for the first time in America in the paperback edition. The hardback was first released in a limited edition with four variations:

 Trade Hardcover
 Collector's Edition (numbers 1 through 50)
 Signature Edition (numbers 51 through 250)
 Lettered Edition (24 copies marked A through Y)

They are identical except the trade hardcover was issued without the patterned leatherette slipcase which accompanied the various signed editions. The Signature Edition, the Collector's Edition and the Lettered Edition have a limitation page signed by both Dean Koontz and Phil Parks, the illustrator. The Collector's Edition was identical to the Signature Edition but included a special inscription by Koontz and an original drawing by Parks. The 24-copy Lettered Edition was divided between Koontz, Parks, and publisher Christopher.

Critical reception

External links
 Review

American horror novels
1985 American novels
Novels by Dean Koontz